USS Anzio (ACV/CVE/CVHE-57), was a  of the United States Navy that saw service during World War II in the Pacific War. Originally classified as an auxiliary aircraft carrier ACV-57, the vessel was laid down in 1942, in Vancouver, Washington, by the Kaiser Shipbuilding Company and initially named Alikula Bay, then renamed Coral Sea and redesignated CVE-57 in 1943. Coral Sea took part in naval operations supporting attacks on the Gilbert and Marshall Islands, New Guinea and the Marianas Islands. In September 1944, she was renamed Anzio. As Anzio, the escort carrier took part in assaults on the Bonin Islands and Okinawa. Following the cessation of hostilities in 1945, Anzio was among the escort carriers used in Operation Magic Carpet, returning US soldiers to the United States. Following this service, she was laid up in reserve at Norfolk, Virginia, in 1946. The escort carrier was redesignated CVHE-57 on 15 June 1955, before being sold for scrap in 1959.

Construction and service

Originally classified as the auxiliary aircraft carrier ACV-57, the vessel's keel was laid down on 12 December 1942, by the Kaiser Shipbuilding Company at their yard in Vancouver, Washington, under a Maritime Commission (MARCOM) contract, MC hull 1094. The vessel was initially named Alikula Bay on 22 January 1943, before being renamed Coral Sea on 3 April 1943. The ship was launched on 1 May 1943, sponsored by Martha Fletcher, wife of Admiral Frank J. Fletcher. Coral Sea was redesignated CVE-57 on 15 July 1943, and commissioned at Astoria, Oregon, on 27 August 1943, Captain Herbert W. Taylor, in command.

Gilbert and Marshall Islands
On 24 September, Coral Sea departed Astoria, for shakedown in Puget Sound. The vessel arrived at San Diego, California, on 8 October, to load aircraft and hold flight operations off the California coast. The carrier sailed for Hawaii on 25 October, and upon arrival at Pearl Harbor, joined by sister ship  for exercises off Oahu. On 10 November, Coral Sea steamed southwest to join the American forces about to invade the Gilbert Islands. She launched strikes on Makin Island from 20 to 28 November. When Tarawa Atoll had been captured, Coral Sea headed for Pearl Harbor and arrived there on 5 December. She paused to embark passengers and load aircraft for transport to the US and departed on 8 December. She arrived at Alameda, California, on 14 December, to take on new aircraft. She put to sea on 22 December, and steamed back to Hawaii. On 28 December, Coral Sea anchored at Pearl Harbor and began preparations for the impending assault on Kwajalein.

Coral Sea was underway on 3 January 1944, for a series of exercises in Hawaiian waters. After final fitting out, she sailed on 22 January, in Task Group 52.9 (TG 52.9) and arrived in the vicinity of Kwajalein, on 31 January, two days after aircraft of the Fast Carrier Task Force began pounding airfields on the atoll. She provided direct and indirect air support for the amphibious landings. On 24 February, the escort carrier set course for Eniwetok, but was recalled to Hawaii, and arrived at Pearl Harbor, on 3 March.

Solomon Islands and New Guinea
After a brief respite, Coral Sea got underway again on 11 March and proceeded to the Solomon Islands. She anchored at Tulagi, on 21 March, and resupplied before sailing again on 30 March, for Emirau Island. From 1–11 April, she launched aircraft in support of forces occupying Emirau and returned to Port Purvis on Florida Island in the Solomons on 15 April. The next day, Coral Sea left Tulagi, to assist in the reconquest of New Guinea. On 19 April, she joined TG 78.2, which was formed to support Allied footholds at Hollandia (currently known as Jayapura) and Aitape. Her aircraft joined in strikes on 22 April, and on 26 April, the escort carrier sailed to Seeadler Harbor, for replenishment and on 7 May, headed for Espiritu Santo, for availability.

Marianas Islands and Bonin Islands operations
Following the completion of repairs, Coral Sea sailed on 8 June, for Kwajalein, the staging point for the invasion of the Marianas Islands. The American forces sortied on 10 June and Coral Sea was among the carriers providing air support for the landings by the 2nd Marine Division on Saipan. Coral Sea endured numerous Japanese air attacks during the next few days receiving minor damage. The carrier moved south to Guam, on 17 June, to begin softening up operations against that island but returned to Saipan, the next day to assist the bogged-down American forces. Coral Sea and her escorts retired to Eniwetok, on 28 June, but returned to Saipan, on 4 July. Her airwing made further airstrikes before she put into Eniwetok, on 15 July, for repairs to her engines. Ultimately, Coral Sea was ordered back to the United States, for a much-needed overhaul and the carrier sailed on 23 July. Two days later, she paused at Kwajalein, to unload most of her aircraft and ammunition and then continued via Pearl Harbor, for the naval base at San Diego. Coral Sea arrived in California, on 9 August, and entered drydock at San Diego, on 31 August. While she was still undergoing an overhaul, Coral Sea received word that her name was being changed to Anzio as of 15 September.

Anzio held sea trials off the California coast and was ready to sail for the western Pacific on 16 September. She reached Hawaii, on 23 September, and entered Pearl Harbor, for tender availability. On 8 October, the carrier began a series of training exercises, and on 16 October, she set out for Eniwetok. There, Anzio joined a hunter-killer group and carried out an antisubmarine warfare (ASW) mission while she was en route to Ulithi. On 4 November, she was ordered to assist the light cruiser  which had been torpedoed in the Philippine Sea.

Anzio resumed combat support operations on 16 February. Three days later, she launched a strike to the north on Chichi Jima, in the Bonin Islands. From 19 February-4 March, she followed a schedule of launching her first flight just before sunset and recovering her last just after dawn. During these nocturnal operations, she completed 106 sorties without a single accident. She departed the Iwo Jima area on 8 March, and entered San Pedro Bay, at Leyte, on 12 March.

Okinawa and post war
After providing air cover for an Okinawa-bound amphibious group, Anzio joined other forces in the vicinity of Kerama Retto, in seizing that island group to provide an advanced base for the Fleet. The Okinawa attack began on 1 April, and she remained on the line until she retired to Ulithi, on 30 April, for repairs to her rudder bearings. On 21 May, the carrier resumed ASW operations in the Okinawa area. This role ended on 17 June, when she sailed to San Pedro Bay, Leyte, for upkeep. 

Anzio left the Philippines, on 6 July, to begin what proved to be her last stint of combat duty. She made ASW patrols in support of Admiral William Halsey's attacks on the Japanese home islands. She received word of the Japanese capitulation on 15 August, and sailed for Guam, on 19 August. After refitting and training new flight crews, the escort carrier headed for Okinawa. From that point, she was to provide air cover and ASW patrol services for transports carrying occupation troops to Korea. On 8 September, she anchored at Jinsen, Korea, whence she provided air support for the landings of the occupation force. She left Korea, on 13 September, and returned to Okinawa. On 19 September, she broke her homeward-bound pennant, became a member of a Magic Carpet group and reached San Francisco, on 30 September.

While at San Francisco, Anzio was modified to provide maximum passenger accommodations. The carrier made two trips to the western Pacific and back, one to Pearl Harbor and one to Shanghai, China, to shuttle American troops home as part of Operation Magic Carpet. She arrived at Seattle, Washington, on 23 December, and ended the year at that port. On 18 January 1946, Anzio sailed for Norfolk, Virginia. She paused at San Francisco, then continued southward to transit the Panama Canal before finally reaching the east coast. Anzio was placed out of commission on 5 August, and became a unit of the Atlantic Reserve Fleet berthed at Norfolk. The ship was redesignated CVHE-57 on 15 June 1955. Anzio was struck from the Naval Vessel Register on 1 March 1959, and sold to Master Metals Co., on 24 November, for scrapping.

Awards
Coral Sea/Anzio received eleven Navy Unit Commendations and nine battle stars for service in World War II. The Secretary of the Navy commended the men of Anzio "For outstanding heroism in action against enemy Japanese forces in the air, ashore and afloat. Operating in the most advanced areas"

References

Bibliography

External links

 

Casablanca-class escort carriers
World War II escort aircraft carriers of the United States
Ships built in Vancouver, Washington
1943 ships
S4-S2-BB3 ships